Ötisheim, known in local dialect as Aize, is a municipality in the Enz district of Baden-Württemberg, Germany.

History
Ötisheim became a property of Maulbronn Monastery around 1177 and remained as such until it was finally and permanently dissolved in 1806. After World War II, it was able to grow substantially thanks its connection by rail.

Geography
The primary watercourse is the Erlenbach, which flows south to southeast through the municipal area. The lowest elevation above sea level in the municipality,  Normalnull (NN), is found where the Erlenbach forms the border with Mühlacker. The highest elevation,  NN, is found at the top of the Sauberg.

The  and  Federally-protected nature reserves are located in the municipal area.

Coat of arms
Ötisheim's coat of arms displays a red crosier crossed by a green lizard upon a field of gold. The crosier is a reference to Maulbronn Monastery and the lizard, pronounced "Aitsa", is a reference to Ötisheim's name in the local dialect, Aize. This pattern and tincture date to 1514, and was approved on 28 September 1950. A variant of this pattern that was used until the 1930s, from a seal dated to 1529, shows just the lizard, placed onto a shield with a two-headed eagle.

References

External links

  (in German)

Enzkreis
Württemberg